Robert III of Scotland was king of Scotland from 1390 to 1406

Robert III may also refer to:

 Robert III, Count of Worms (800–834) 
 Robert III, Prince of Capua (1153–1158) 
 Robert III, Count of Loritello (died 1182)
 Robert III de Brus (fl. 12th century, died ca. 1191)
 Robert III, Count of Dreux (1185–1234)
 Robert III, Count of Flanders (1249 – September 17, 1322)
 Robert III of Artois (1287–1342) 
 Robert III de La Marck (1491–1537)